Sinking Creek is a tributary of Penns Creek in Centre County, Pennsylvania, in the United States.

Course
Sinking Creek begins in the Bear Meadows Natural Area in a valley in Harris Township. It flows northeast for a few miles and its valley narrows. The creek eventually enters Potter Township, where it turns northwest before turning northeast again. A short distance later, it passes through Colyer Lake and picks up the tributary Boal Gap Run a short distance afterwards. The creek then begins meandering and crosses U.S. Route 322. Some distance later, it crosses Pennsylvania Route 144 and receives the tributary Potter Run. The course of the creek becomes slightly straighter as it continues northeast on the northern side of a mountain. It eventually enters Gregg Township.

Geography

Sinking Creek is a relatively small and overgrown stream upstream of Potter Run. There are also fences and fallen trees along the creek.

Watershed

Recreation
It is possible to canoe on at least  of Sinking Creek during snowmelt or within one week of heavy rain. The creek's difficulty rating is 1. Edward Gertler describes the scenery along the creek as "good" in his book Keystone Canoeing.

See also
List of rivers of Pennsylvania

References

Rivers of Pennsylvania
Tributaries of the Susquehanna River
Rivers of Centre County, Pennsylvania